WAVQ (1400 AM) is a radio station licensed to serve Jacksonville, North Carolina, United States. The station is owned by and operated by Donald Curtis' Eastern Airwaves, LLC.  
WAVQ broadcasts a classic hits music format serving Jacksonville and Onslow County, North Carolina.

The station was assigned the WAVQ call sign by the Federal Communications Commission on February 6, 2009.

History
WAVQ signed on in late 2008, under the callsign WSTK, offering an Oldies format as 1400 The Wave. The station was originally owned by Conner Media Corporation.

The WAVQ call letters were assigned on February 6, 2009.

On August 9, 2009 the format was changed to Sports-Talk as ESPN Radio 1400. Later, in July 2011, becoming a simulcast of ESPN affiliate WWNB 1490 AM in New Bern, North Carolina.

In November 2012, WAVQ was sold to CDV Broadcasting, LLC and the format was changed to classic hits as 1400 The Q. In January 2013, an FM translator was added at 95.5 FM.

Effective October 30, 2020, CDV Broadcasting sold WAVQ and two translators to Donald Curtis' Eastern Airwaves, LLC for $270,000.

References

External links

AVQ
Radio stations established in 2008